Mesulfen (2,7-dimethylthianthrene) is an anti-acne preparation as well as a scabicide. It is a dimethyl derivative of thianthrene.

References 

Anti-acne preparations
Thianthrenes